Tony Sweet (born October 20, 1949) is an American photographer, known for his widely published nature photography. He is also a jazz musician, workshop instructor, and author.

Career
Tony Sweet worked as a professional jazz drummer for 20 years, playing with such jazz musicians as Sonny Stitt, Joe Henderson, Tal Farlow, and Johnny Coles, among others. He started working in photography during the period in jazz clubs. Sweet later changed careers and focused on nature photography. He is now best known for his fine art nature and floral images using digital technology to produce fine art ink-jet (giclee) prints. His photographs are published internationally and represented by Getty Images.

Sweet conducts photography workshops throughout the United States and Canada. Tony maintains an active speaking schedule on the subjects of nature and flower photography and marketing, lecturing at professional photography organizations, universities, seminars, and workshops in the U.S. and Canada. He is a member of the Baltimore chapter of the American Society of Media Photographers (ASMP), and is a member nikSoftware’s Team Nik.

Collections
 Nikon corporate office
 Mercy Medical Center
 Johns Hopkins Breast Center
 Smithsonian in Washington, D.C.
 Nelson/Harvey building, Johns Hopkins Hospital

Publications

Web
 Nikonnet.com 
 Betterphoto.com - staff instructor.

Magazine
 Nikon World magazine.

Books 
" Fine Art Digital Photography (April, 2009, Stackpole Books)
 Fine Art Nature Photography: Water, Ice, and Fog    (Jan 2007, Stackpole Books)
 Fine Art Flower Photography    (Apr 2005, Stackpole Books)
 Chapter contributor to The Best of Nature Photography   (July 2003, Amherst Media)
 Image contributor to   New England On My Mind   (Aug 2003, Global Pequot)
 Fine Art Nature Photography    (Jul 2002, Stackpole Books)

Recordings 
 The Howard Burns Quartet, Lucinda's Serenade  (Jan 2000)
 The Pat Harbison Quintet, A Road Less Traveled
 The Cal Collins Quartet, Ohio Style  (July 1991)

Awards 
 Nikon Legend Behind the Lens.
Nature photographer of the year 2001.

References

1949 births
Living people
American photographers
Jazz photographers
People from Baltimore County, Maryland
Place of birth missing (living people)
Stock photographers